Yolande Gagnon is a former provincial level politician from Alberta, Canada. She served as a member of the Legislative Assembly of Alberta from 1989 to 1993.

Political career
Gagnon ran for a seat in the Alberta Legislature in the 1989 Alberta general election. She won the electoral district of Calgary-McKnight by a slim margin in a hotly contested three-way race over Progressive Conservative candidate Mark Petros.

Her electoral district was abolished due to redistribution. Gagnon ran for a second term in office in the new electoral district of Calgary Nose Creek for the 1993 Alberta general election. She was defeated by Progressive Conservative candidate Gary Mar in a closely contested race.

References

External links
Legislative Assembly of Alberta Members Listing

Alberta Liberal Party MLAs
Women MLAs in Alberta
Living people
Franco-Albertan people
Year of birth missing (living people)